The 1886 Indianola Hurricane was a powerful tropical cyclone that destroyed the town of Indianola, Texas in August 1886, remarkably impacting the history and economic development of Texas. It was the fifth and strongest hurricane of the 1886 Atlantic hurricane season, and one of the most intense hurricanes to ever hit the United States.

Meteorological history

A tropical storm developed east of Trinidad and Tobago on August 12, and began moving northwestward. Originally it was thought the storm became a Category 1 hurricane the next day but re-analysis now shows it remained as a tropical storm until August 14. On the evening of August 15 it reached the island of Hispaniola. After crossing the south of that island as a Category 1 hurricane, it struck southeastern Cuba on August 16 as a Category 2 hurricane. The storm briefly weakened over land and entered the Gulf of Mexico near Matanzas on August 18 as a Category 1 storm. As the hurricane crossed the Gulf of Mexico it strengthened further, first to a Category 2 then to a Category 3 cyclone. As it approached the coast of Texas, it intensified to a 150 mph (240 km/h) Category 4 hurricane. At the time, it was tied for the strongest hurricane ever recorded (the first reported, and confirmed, Category 5 hurricane would be in 1924). On August 19, winds increased in Indianola, and, on August 20, it made landfall as a catastrophic Category 4 hurricane. Pressure at landfall is estimated to be 925 mbar, which would make it the sixth strongest hurricane known to have hit the United States, and by winds, it is tied for the fifth most powerful hurricane to hit the U.S. mainland. The hurricane moved inland and eventually dissipated on August 21 in northeast Texas.

Impact
The total death toll was at least 74, including 28 in Cuba.

The storm made landfall on the coast of Texas on August 20, wreaking property destruction in a number of towns, and resulting in a number of deaths.

In Texas, the hurricane obliterated the town of Indianola that was only just recovering from a powerful 1875 hurricane on the same location. At Indianola a storm surge of 15 feet from Matagorda Bay overwhelmed the town. Every building in the town was either destroyed or left uninhabitable. When the Signal Office was blown down, a fire started which took hold and destroyed several neighboring blocks. The fire destroyed all but two of the town's buildings and killed a large number of citizens. The storm also destroyed two and half miles of railroad track, making communication with Indianola very difficult and complicating rescue efforts. This storm caused fewer fatalities however (46 in Indianola, compared to 400 in the 1875 storm), largely because the storm struck during the day and residents had time to take shelter. The hurricane also ended a severe drought in Texas.

The village of Quintana, at the mouth of the Brazos River, was also destroyed. At Houston, the bayou rose between 5–6 feet on August 19.
The storm reached Victoria, Texas at about 7 AM, destroying or damaging most of the buildings in the city.  An estimated 75 houses were destroyed and another 118 were damaged.  The town's jail and high school were both damaged while the freight station, Masonic hall, and certain sections of town were "almost literally swept from the earth." No deaths were reported in the town, but the initial damages were estimated at $100,000 (equivalent to $ million in ) and the citizens of the town declared the hurricane "the most terrible storm ever known in Victoria."

In Galveston, Texas, the storm capsized a forty-ton schooner, the Liviona Perkins, killing three crew members. The storm also damaged roads, railways, and houses, leading to an estimated $200,000 in damage (equivalent to $ million in ).

Aftermath
Many of Indianola's residents relocated farther inland after the storm. Five weeks later, in September 1886, another hurricane hit the Texas coast between Brownsville and Corpus Christi. Indianola was again flooded by rainwater and storm surge from Matagorda Bay. The remaining residents were evacuated. Following this storm the post office at Indianola was shut down, marking the official abandonment of the town. The old town's ruins sit just offshore under 15 feet of water in Matagorda Bay.

The storm ended the rivalry between Galveston and Indianola as the chief port of Texas. With the abandonment of Indianola and the unwillingness of the former residents to rebuild close to shore, Galveston became the most important Texan port until the catastrophic damage wrought there by the 1900 Galveston hurricane led to the rise of Houston as a major port on the Texan coast.

See also

List of tropical cyclones
List of Atlantic hurricanes
1900 Galveston hurricane
 Napatree Point, Rhode Island, wiped out in similar fashion by 1938 hurricane.

References

External links
 Indianola history at Indianola, TX website

Indianola Hurricane, 1886
Category 4 Atlantic hurricanes
Hurricanes in Texas
Spanish colonial period of Cuba
Indianola Hurricane, 1886
1886 in Cuba
Hurricanes in Cuba
1886 natural disasters
1886 meteorology
1886 in Texas
August 1886 events